Zhengdian Subdistrict is a subdistrict in Jiangxia District, Wuhan, Hubei, China. , it has 2 residential communities and 21 villages under its administration.

See also 
 List of township-level divisions of Hubei

References 

Township-level divisions of Hubei
Geography of Wuhan
Subdistricts of the People's Republic of China